The K Line is a light rail line running north-south between the Jefferson Park and Westchester neighborhoods of Los Angeles, California, passing through various South Los Angeles neighborhoods and the city of Inglewood. It is one of seven lines in the Los Angeles Metro Rail system operated by the Los Angeles County Metropolitan Transportation Authority (LACMTA). It was opened on October 7, 2022, making it the system's newest line.

The K Line represents the initial operating segment of the Crenshaw/LAX Line project, which began construction in 2014. A segment connecting to the C Line via a wye is expected to open in fall 2023; the C and K Lines will be integrated and services realigned at that time, although the service pattern has yet to be determined. A connection to the new LAX Automated People Mover is planned for late 2024.

Service description

Route 
The Metro K Line's northern terminus is at Expo/Crenshaw station, a transfer point to the E Line. The K Line station here is underground and does not provide a track connection to the at-grade E Line. Provisions are in place to allow the line to extend north. The route follows Crenshaw Boulevard from Exposition Boulevard south to 67th Street. From 59th and 67th Streets, the line returns underground into a shallow cut and cover tunnel for a half-mile. 

South of there, the route emerges from the tunnel and enters the Harbor Subdivision right-of-way, which runs parallel to Florence Avenue and Aviation Boulevard. The line mostly operates at-grade in this exclusive right-of-way, briefly transitioning onto elevated viaducts to cross over major thoroughfares including La Brea Avenue and Interstate 405. Traveling the complete length of the line takes approximately 18 minutes.

The current southern terminus of the line is Westchester/Veterans station. The extension under construction continues along an exclusive right-of-way, crossing over Manchester Boulevard, Century Boulevard and Imperial Highway. At Century Boulevard, Aviation/Century Station will sit on a viaduct. The line will then briefly enter an open trench as it passes close to the LAX runways before connecting at a wye to the existing C Line just to the west of Aviation/LAX station. Until this extension opens, Metro is operating a bus shuttle called the "C & K Line Link" from Westchester/Veterans to Aviation/LAX.

Hours and frequency

Station listing 
The project includes nine new stations:

History 

Los Angeles Railway Line 5 yellow streetcars served Crenshaw and Florence Boulevards until 1955 when the service was replaced with buses.

Extending the Green Line to LAX was an early goal of Los Angeles transit planners. Studies in 1984 and 1988 outlined a route from the junction near Aviation/Century and running to the northeast, similar to later plans for the second section of the Sepulveda Transit Corridor.

The line was planned following the Los Angeles riots of 1992 as a way to better serve transit-dependent residents in the corridor while at the same time providing stimulus for positive economic growth in the South Los Angeles region. It was championed by State Senator Diane Watson and County Supervisor Yvonne Brathwaite Burke, both representing portions of the corridor.

A Major Investment Study was initiated in 1993, and after more than a decade of study, a Final Environmental Impact Report was completed in May 2011. The FTA gave its approval to build the line in 2012, and heavy construction began in June 2014, funded by Measure R. Los Angeles County Supervisor Mark Ridley-Thomas was a key advocate for tunnelling and other grade separation along the line. 

The route was designated as the K Line in November 2019. Originally scheduled to open in 2019, the project saw repeated delays. In April 2020, Metro announced that the completion date for the project would be pushed to no earlier than May 2021 due to construction issues. The support structures for bridges and tunnels had concrete plinths that were incorrectly installed, requiring extensive repairs to sections where tracks had already been installed. The northern portion of the line ultimately opened on October 7, 2022.

Future development

LAX/Metro Transit Center

The line was from its inception intended to offer a connection to LAX via an Automated People Mover (APM). However, at the time the line was designed, it was unclear where exactly that connection would take place. While initial expections were that the connection would be at Aviation/Century station, ultimately the route chosen for the LAX Automated People Mover intersected with the new line at 96th Street, about half a mile to the north, requiring the design of an infill station while the overall line was still under construction.

In 2014, Metro approved the planning and scoping of this station, which was called Aviation/96th in planning documents but was ultimately designated LAX/Metro Transit Center station. This station is intended to serve as Metro Rail's main gateway to the airport itself, while the Aviation/Century station will serve destinations along the busy Century Boulevard corridor. 

While initial plans called for the full length of the project to be opened for service while the LAX/Metro Transit Center was under development, delays in the opening of the main line meant that major construction on the station was already underway by the time the line was ready. As a result, the line opened on October 7, 2022 only from Expo/Crenshaw to Westechester/Veterans. The full length of the line, including Aviation/Century and the connection to the C Line, is now planned to open in 2023, while LAX/Metro Transit Center itself will open in 2024.

Future service patterns 

Varying service patterns have been proposed for integrating the completed Crenshaw/LAX Line into the rest of the system over the course of its planning and construction, all of which have involved sharing trackage and infrastructure facilities with the existing C Line. Although some early proposals would've sent trains through all three directions of the wye that will connect the existing C Line with the new segment, this was rejected by Metro because it would cause too much wear and tear on the track switch mechanisms.

The debate over service patterns proved somewhat contentious, as the final pattern must balance the needs of riders, operational needs, and the political constituencies of Metro's board members. In 2018, with the line then scheduled to open within the year, the Metro Board of Directors overrode a recommendation by operations staff that would've had a single line operating between Expo/Crenshaw and Norwalk station. Passengers from the Redondo Beach area would have been served by a shuttle to the LAX area, where they would need to transfer to another train to continue east or north. Instead, board members approved a one-year pilot of a configuration that would combine an Expo-to-Norwalk line with another line that would connect Redondo Beach with Willowbrook/Rosa Parks station, allowing transfers to the A and J Lines.  The approved plan would incur higher operating expenses but board members argued it would retain better transfer opportunities for South Bay residents.

Ongoing construction delays led to a reassessment of that plan in 2022. Metro recommended public outreach aimed at reformulating the operating plan before the connection to the C Line opens in 2023; in March of 2023, Metro indicated that it would recommend service pattern C-2 in the figure above, in which the K Line would run north-south from Expo/Crenshaw to Redondo Beach, and the C Line would run from Norwalk to LAX.

Centinela Avenue grade separation
Metro has plans to convert the current at-grade crossing at Centinela Avenue to an above-grade crossing, which the agency estimates could be finished by 2026 or 2027.

Northern extension to Hollywood 

The original plans for the Crenshaw Corridor project connected Wilshire Blvd to LAX. However, once LRT was selected as the preferred mode, the cost for the entire route exceeded the project budget, so that part of the corridor north of Exposition Boulevard was deferred until funds became available. The final design for the Crenshaw/LAX project included a tunneled station at Crenshaw/Expo to accommodate a potential northward extension, which increased the cost of the original project by $236 million. With the passage of Measure M and the enthusiastic support of the City of West Hollywood, the K Line Extension, which would travel north from the current Expo/Crenshaw terminus, connecting along the way to the B and D Lines, is currently under development.

Incidents

 On February 18, 2023, an eastbound train collided with a cement mixer at the Cedar Ave crossing between Downtown Inglewood and Westchester stations.

See also 
 Foothill Extension
 D Line Extension
 Regional Connector
 West Santa Ana Branch Transit Corridor

References

External links 
 Crenshaw/LAX Transit Project – official Metro website
 Crenshaw/LAX Transit Corridor Map (pdf)

 
Railway lines opened in 2022
Airport rail links in the United States
Crenshaw, Los Angeles
Inglewood, California
Light rail in California
Los Angeles International Airport
Los Angeles Metro Rail projects
Public transportation in the San Gabriel Valley
South Los Angeles
Tram and light rail transit systems under construction
Railroad tunnels in California
2022 establishments in California